Christian Heule (born 2 April 1975 in Sankt Gallen) is a Swiss professional racing cyclist.

His sporting career began with VC Uznach. He began his professional career in 1998 with the Ericsson Villiger cycling team. After two years he joined the Post Swiss Team and after a further two years he switched to Team Cologne. In 2003 he went to Macandina Kewa-wheel-VC Gippingen where he won a road stage of the Tour of Slovenia. Between 2005 and 2007, Heule rode for the German Stevens Racing team. In 2008, he became the leader of the Belgian Rendementhypo Cycling Team.

Heule is relatively unknown in his home country, but quite popular in the Campine in Belgium.

Career highlights

 1997: 2nd in National Championship, Cyclo-cross, U23, Switzerland, Liestal (SUI)
 1998: 3rd in Steinmaur, Cyclo-cross (SUI)
 2000: 2nd in GP Wielerrevue (NED)
 2000: 3rd in Hombrechtikon, Cyclo-cross (SUI)
 2000: 2nd in Leimentalrundfahrt, Oberwil (SUI)
 2000: 2nd in Oberschlierbach, Cyclo-cross (a) (AUT)
 2000: 3rd in Oberschlierbach, Cyclo-cross (b) (AUT)
 2000: 1st in Frankfurt/Main, Cyclo-cross (GER)
 2000: 2nd in Fond-de-Gras, Cyclo-cross (LUX)
 2001: 2nd in Tour du Canton de Genève (SUI)
 2001: 2nd in Fond-de-Gras, Cyclo-cross (LUX)
 2002: 3rd in Uzwil, Criterium (GER)
 2002: 1st in Ruggell (SUI)
 2002: 1st in Tour du Canton de Genève (SUI)
 2002: 1st in Ottikon, Cyclo-cross (SUI)
 2002: 3rd in Bützberg, Cyclo-cross (SUI)
 2002: 1st in Fond-de-Gras, Cyclo-cross (LUX)
 2003: 3rd in Russikon, Cyclo-cross (SUI)
 2003: 2nd in Lyss (b) (SUI)
 2003: 1st in Stage 4 Tour de Slovénie, Kranj (SLO)
 2003: 1st in GP de la Commune de Leudelange (LUX)
 2003: 1st in Einsiedeln (SUI)
 2003: 3rd in Meilen, Cyclo-cross (SUI)
 2004: 1st in Uster, Cyclo-cross, Uster (SUI)
 2004: 1st in National Championship, Cyclo-cross, Elite, Switzerland (SUI)
 2004: 1st in Stage 3 Tour of Japan, Shuz (JPN)
 2004: 2nd in General Classification Tour of Japan (JPN)
 2004: 1st in Hombrechtikon, Cyclo-cross (SUI)
 2005: 2nd in National Championship, Cyclo-cross, Elite, Switzerland, Meilen (SUI)
 2005: 1st in Weitenau (GER)
 2005: 3rd in Aalter, Cyclo-cross (BEL)
 2005: 1st in Schulteiss-Cup, Cyclo-cross (GER)
 2005: 2nd in Hamburg, Cyclo-cross (GER)
 2005: 1st in Rüti, Cyclo-cross (SUI)
 2005: 3rd in Steinmaur, Cyclo-cross (SUI)
 2005: 1st in Hittnau, Cyclo-cross (SUI)
 2005: 2nd in Nommay, Cyclo-cross (FRA)
 2006: 1st in National Championship, Cyclo-cross, Elite, Switzerland, Meilen (SUI)
 2006: 1st in Hamburg, Cyclo-cross, Hamburg (GER)
 2006: 1st in Hamburg, Cyclo-cross (b), Hamburg (GER)
 2006: 1st in Schulteiss-Cup, Cyclo-cross (GER)
 2006: 2nd in Fehraltorf, Cyclo-cross (SUI)
 2006: 1st in Rüti, Cyclo-cross (SUI)
 2006: 1st in Magstadt, Cyclo-cross (GER)
 2006: 1st in Schmerikon, Cyclo-cross (SUI)
 2006: 1st in Hittnau, Cyclo-cross (SUI)
 2006: 1st in Asteasu, Cyclo-cross (ESP)
 2006: 1st in Wetzikon, Cyclo-cross (SUI)
 2007: 2nd in Dübendorf, Cyclo-cross (SUI)
 2007: 1st in National Championship, Cyclo-cross, Elite, Switzerland, Steinmaur (SUI)
 2007: 2nd in Prologue Tour Alsace, Sausheim (FRA)
 2007: 2nd in Bern-West (SUI)
 2007: 1st in Redmond, Cyclo-cross (USA)
 2007: 1st in Lakewood, Cyclo-cross (USA)
 2007: 2nd in Las Vegas, Cyclo-cross (USA)
 2007: 2nd in Fehraltorf, Cyclo-cross (SUI)
 2007: 2nd in Woerden, Cyclo-cross (NED)
 2007: 1st in Magstadt, Cyclo-cross (GER)
 2007: 1st in Hittnau, Cyclo-cross (SUI)
 2007: 2nd in Butzberg, Cyclo-cross (SUI)
 2007: 3rd in Wetzikon, Cyclo-cross (SUI)
 2007: 1st in Meilen, Cyclo-cross (SUI)
 2007: 1st in Schmerikon, Cyclo-cross (SUI)
 2008: 1st in Dübendorf, Cyclo-cross (SUI)
 2008: 1st in National Championship, Cyclo-cross, Elite, Switzerland, Frenkendorf (SUI)

References

External links

Christian Heule photo ebook

1975 births
Living people
Sportspeople from St. Gallen (city)
Swiss male cyclists
Cyclo-cross cyclists
Cape Epic cyclists